The Mali are an occupational caste found among the Hindus who traditionally worked as gardeners and florists. They also call themselves Phul Mali due to their occupation of growing flowers. The Mali are found throughout North India, East India as well as the Terai region of Nepal and Maharashtra.

Iravati Karve, an anthropologist, showed how the Maratha caste was generated from Kunbis who simply started calling themselves "Maratha". She states that Maratha, Kunbi and Mali are the three main farming communities of Maharashtra – the difference being that the Marathas and Kunbis were "dry farmers" whereas the Mali farmed throughout the year.

Mali of Northern india
There are many endogamous groups within Malis. Not all Mali groups have the same origin, culture, history or social standing and there is at least one group - the Rajput Mali, from Rajasthan - that overlaps with Rajputs and was included under the Rajput sub-category in the 1891 State Census Report for Marwar.

Adoption of the surname Saini 
The Mali community of Rajasthan state adopted the surname Saini during the 1930s when India was under British colonial rule.

Mali caste of Maharashtra 

The Mali of Maharashtra are a caste of cultivators specializing in horticulture. The caste is concentrated in five districts of Western Maharashtra and a district in the Vidarbha region. They traditionally made their living by cultivating fruit, flowers and vegetables. There are many different sub-castes depending on what the sub-group cultivated, for example, the Phul mali were florists, the Jire mali grew jire or cumin, and halde mali cultivated Halad(turmeric) etc. In the 20th century, the mali have been the pioneers in using irrigation to grow cash crops such as sugar cane and in establishing farmer owned sugar mills.  This led later in the century of wide spread cultivation of sugarcane in Western Maharashtra by other communities as well as the establishment hundreds of sugar mills in Maharashtra and other regions of India.

Social activism & politics
The 19th century social reformer, Jyotirao Phule belonged to the Mali community.His work extended to many fields including eradication of untouchability and the caste system, and women's emancipation. He and his wife, Savitribai Phule, were pioneers of education for women and Dalits in India. The couple was among the first native Indians to open a school for girls of India. He also founded a home for pregnant Hindu brahmin widows who were cast out by their families. In 1873, Phule, along with his followers, formed the Satyashodhak Samaj (Society of Seekers of Truth) to attain equal rights for people from lower castes. Other Mali such as Gyanoba Sasane and Narayan lokhande were leading members and financial supporters of the Samaj in its early years. Lokhande has been called the father of trade Unionism in India.

References
Notes

Citations

Bibliography

Indian castes
Social groups of Rajasthan
Social groups of Haryana